Central defence may refer to one of the following:

 An  association football position, see centre-back
 A military strategy on how to use fortifications, see central defence (strategy)